The , or "Oriental Library", is Japan's largest Asian studies library and one of the world's five largest, located in Tokyo. It also functions as a research institute dedicated to the study of Asian history and culture. It has greatly contributed to the development of Asian Studies through the acquisition of books and other source materials as well as the publication of research by Japanese scholars. Presently, the library contains approximately 950,000 volumes which are cataloged linguistically according to Asian, Western and Japanese language materials.

History

The library had its beginnings in 1917 when Hisaya Iwasaki, former third President of the Mitsubishi Company, purchased the vast private collection of China-related publications of Australian adventurer, journalist, and Republic of China government adviser George Morrison. After the purchase, Iwasaki improved on the collection by increasing the number of classical Chinese, Japanese and western language books. This gave way to the development of the first library institution in Japan that was devoted exclusively to Asian Studies.

It initially opened in 1924, and in 1948 the Library was made a branch of the National Diet Library as result of the financial fallout from World War II, and in 1961 was made a UNESCO affiliated organisation as the Centre for East Asian Cultural Studies. Also, in 1994 a center was set up within the library to provide research facilities for scholars dispatched from France.

Organization
Major decisions concerning the management of the library are made by its Advisory Council and Board of Directors. Daily operations are supervised by the Committee of Department heads. As of 2007, the library was staffed by 20 full-time employees working under the supervision of the Director General Makihara Minoru, and Executive Director Yamakawa Naoyoshi. In addition, there were over 200 research fellows participating in Toyo Bunko-sponsored projects.

See also
Mitsubishi
List of National Treasures of Japan (writings)

References

External links
 The Toyo Bunko, or, The Oriental Library, official website
 National Institute of Informatics - Digital Silk Road Project Digital Archive of Toyo Bunko Rare Books 
 Digital Silk Road 	> 	Toyo Bunko Archive 	> 	List of Books

 

Libraries in Tokyo
Mitsubishi